Sinocoelotes is a genus of spiders in the family Agelenidae. It was first described in 2016 by Zhao & Li. , it contains 15 species from China and Thailand.

Species
Sinocoelotes comprises the following species:
Sinocoelotes acicularis (Wang, Griswold & Ubick, 2009)
Sinocoelotes cangshanensis Zhao & Li, 2016
Sinocoelotes forficatus (Liu & Li, 2010)
Sinocoelotes guangxian (Zhang, Yang, Zhu & Song, 2003)
Sinocoelotes hehuaensis Zhao & Li, 2016
Sinocoelotes kangdingensis Zhao & Li, 2016
Sinocoelotes ludingensis Zhao & Li, 2016
Sinocoelotes luoshuiensis Zhao & Li, 2016
Sinocoelotes mahuanggouensis Zhao & Li, 2016
Sinocoelotes mangbangensis Zhao & Li, 2016
Sinocoelotes muliensis Zhao & Li, 2016
Sinocoelotes pseudoterrestris (Schenkel, 1963)
Sinocoelotes pseudoyunnanensis (Wang, Griswold & Ubick, 2009)
Sinocoelotes thailandensis (Dankittipakul & Wang, 2003)
Sinocoelotes yanyuanensis Zhao & Li, 2016

References

Agelenidae
Araneomorphae genera
Spiders of Asia